Gelechia atrofusca is a moth of the family Gelechiidae. It is found in Russia.

The Latin specific epithet atrofusca refers to dark-swarthy, dark-brown coloured, atro-fuscus.

References

Moths described in 1986
Gelechia